Clarendon may refer to:

Places

Australia
Clarendon, New South Wales, a suburb of Sydney
Clarendon, Queensland, a rural locality in the Somerset Region
Clarendon, South Australia
Clarendon, Victoria, in the Shire of Moorabool
Clarendon County, New South Wales

Canada
Clarendon Parish, New Brunswick
Clarendon, a community in Petersville Parish, New Brunswick, near Clarendon Parish
Clarendon Station, Ontario
Clarendon, Quebec

England
Clarendon Park, Leicester
Clarendon Park, Wiltshire
Clarendon Palace, within the park
Great Clarendon Street and Little Clarendon Street, Oxford

Jamaica
Clarendon Parish, Jamaica
Clarendon Park, Jamaica

United States
Clarendon, Arkansas
Clarendon, New York
Clarendon, North Carolina
Clarendon, Pennsylvania
Clarendon, Texas
Clarendon, Vermont
Clarendon, Arlington, Virginia
Clarendon County, South Carolina
Clarendon Township, Michigan

People
Earl of Clarendon, a peerage of England
Edward Hyde, 1st Earl of Clarendon (1609–1674), English historian, Chancellor of the Exchequer, Lord Chancellor, and a close political advisor to Charles II
Frederick Clarendon (c.1820–1904), Irish architect
Layshia Clarendon (born 1991), American basketball player

Other uses
The Clarendon Academy, secondary school in Trowbridge, England
Clarendon Building, University of Oxford, England
Clarendon Commission, 1861 investigation of leading schools in England
Clarendon Consolidated Independent School District, Texas, United States
Clarendon County School District, South Carolina, United States
Clarendon Entertainment, New York City film production and distribution company
Clarendon Film Company, early British film studio
Clarendon Fund, scholarship scheme at the University of Oxford, England
Clarendon House, mansion in Piccadilly, London
Clarendon Laboratory, Oxford University, England
Clarendon, part of Nottingham College
Clarendon Palace, Wiltshire, England
Constitutions of Clarendon, legislative procedures passed by Henry II of England in 1164
Clarendon Press, Oxford, England
Clarendon School, historic school building in Arlington, Virginia, United States
Clarendon School for Girls, a defunct girls' private school at various sites in the United Kingdom
Clarendon School District, Arkansas, United States
Clarendon Stakes, Canadian horse race
Clarendon Way, long-distance footpath in Hampshire and Wiltshire, England
Clarendon (typeface), slab serif typeface
Clarendon (Washington Metro), D.C. subway station
Clarendon-Linden fault system, New York state, United States
Lord Clarendon (ship), Canadian sailing ship
USS Clarendon, US Navy attack transport ship

See also
Clarendon College (disambiguation), a number of secondary schools
Clarendon High School (disambiguation), a number of secondary schools
Clarendon Hills (disambiguation)
Clarendon Hotel (disambiguation)